The Bayer designation c Aquarii is shared by three stars in the constellation Aquarius:

 c1 Aquarii or 86 Aquarii
 c2 Aquarii or 88 Aquarii
 c3 Aquarii or 89 Aquarii

c Aquarii
Aquarii, c